Franz Friedrich Richard Genée (7 February 1823 – 15 June 1895) was a Prussian born Austrian librettist, playwright, and composer.

Life
Genée was born in Danzig. He died at Baden bei Wien.

Works
He is most famous for the libretto of Die Fledermaus, Johann Strauss II's most famous operetta. He co-wrote the libretto without having met top-billed librettist Karl Haffner, who constructed the new story based on a play by Henri Meilhac and Ludovic Halévy, which was considered too shocking to perform outside Paris. Genée, however, wrote the operetta's actual text and drew nothing from Haffner beyond the names of the characters. One of his best-known works was the libretto of Carl Millöcker's operetta Der Bettelstudent, which he co-wrote with Friedrich Zell (the pseudonym of Camillo Walzel). He also wrote the libretto to Ella Adayevskaya's 1877 opera Zarya. In 1857 he was conductor of the Philharmonic Orchestra Mainz.

Librettos and plays
 Polyphen oder Ein Abenteuer auf Martinique 1856
 Der Geiger aus Tirol 1857
 Der Liebesring um 1860
 Ein Trauerspiel 1860
 Ein Narrentraum 1861
 Die Generalprobe 1862
 Die Herren von der Livrée 1862
 Die Talismänner 1863
 Rosita 1864
 Der schwarze Prinz 1866
 Die Zopfabschneider 1866
 Am Runenstein 1868
 Schwefeles, der Höllenagent 1869
 Eine Konzertprobe 1870
 Der Hexensabbath 1870
 Der Sänger mit drei Tönen 1871
 Der Karneval in Rom 1873, with Josef Braun, operetta in 3 acts (Music: Johann Strauss II)
 Die Fledermaus, 1874, with Carl Haffner, operetta in 3 acts (Music: Johann Strauss II)
 Cleopatra oder Durch drei Jahrtausende 1875
 Cagliostro in Wien 1875, with F. Zell, operetta in 3 acts (Music: Johann Strauss II)
 Fatinitza 1876, with F. Zell, Operetten in 3 acts (Music: Franz von Suppé)
  1876, with F. Zell, operetta in 3 acts (Musik: Richard Genée)
 Luftschlösser 1876
 Im Wunderland der Pyramiden 1877
 Die letzten Mohikaner 1878
Boccaccio 1879, with F. Zell, operetta in 3 acts (Music: Franz von Suppé)
 Die Dubarry 1879, with F. Zell, operetta in 3 acts (Music: Carl Millöcker)
 Das Spitzentuch der Königin 1880, with Heinrich Bohrmann-Riegen, operetta in 3 acts (Music: Johann Strauss II)
 Apajune, der Wassermann 1880, with F. Zell, operetta in 3 acts (Music: Carl Millöcker)
Donna Juanita 1880, with F. Zell, operetta in 3 acts (Music: Franz von Suppé)
 Nisida 1880
 Der Gascogner 1881, with F. Zell, operetta in 3 acts (Music: Franz von Suppé)
 Rosina 1881
 Der lustige Krieg 1881, with F. Zell, operetta in 3 acts (Music: Johann Strauss II)
 Der Bettelstudent 1882, with F. Zell, operetta in 3 acts (Musik: Carl Millöcker)
 Eine Nacht in Venedig 1883, with F. Zell, operetta in 3 acts (Music: Johann Strauss II)
 Die Afrikareise, 1883, with Moritz West, operetta in 3 acts (Music: Franz von Suppé)
 Gasparone 1884, with F. Zell, operetta in 3 acts (Music: Carl Millöcker)
 Eine gemachte Frau 1885
 Zwillinge 1885
 Die Piraten 1886
 Der Vizeadmiral 1886, with F. Zell, operetta in 3 acts (Music: Carl Millöcker)
 Die Dreizehn 1887
 Die Jagd nach dem Glück 1888, with Bruno Zappert, operetta in 3 acts (Music: Franz von Suppé)
 Signora Vedetta 1892
 Die wachsame Schildwache 1893
 Freund Felix 1894

Musical compositions
In 1876, Genée composed the operetta . The operetta featured a game of chess in its second act and later lent its name to the chess opening trap found in the match the Seekadettenmatt (German for naval cadet (The Royal Middy) mate). The move is usually known in English as the Légal Trap.
 Rosita (opera)
 Nanon, die Wirtin Zum Goldenen Lamm 1877, with F. Zell, operetta in 3 acts, (Music: Richard Genée)
  1862, operetta, (Music: Richard Genée)
 Italian Salad / Insalata Italiana, Op. 68, ("Piano, piano, dolce, soave!") for madrigal choir and soloists in which the words are italian musical expressions, sung according to the meaning of the words.

Films based on his works
, directed by Ernst Lubitsch (Germany, 1917, loosely based on the operetta Die Fledermaus)
Die Fledermaus, directed by Max Mack (Germany, 1923, based on the operetta Die Fledermaus)
Nanon, directed by Hanns Schwarz (Germany, 1924, based on the operetta Nanon)
The Beggar Student, directed by Luise Fleck and Jacob Fleck (Germany, 1927, based on the operetta Der Bettelstudent)
The Beggar Student, directed by Victor Janson (Germany, 1931, based on the operetta Der Bettelstudent)
The Beggar Student, directed by Victor Hanbury and John Harvel (UK, 1931, based on the operetta Der Bettelstudent)
Die Fledermaus, directed by Karel Lamač (Germany, 1931, based on the operetta Die Fledermaus)
, directed by Karel Lamač and Pierre Billon (France, 1932, based on the operetta Die Fledermaus)
Waltz Time, directed by Wilhelm Thiele (UK, 1933, based on the operetta Die Fledermaus)

The Loves of Madame Dubarry, directed by Marcel Varnel (UK, 1935, based on the operetta Die Dubarry)

The Beggar Student, directed by Georg Jacoby (Germany, 1936, based on the operetta Der Bettelstudent)
, directed by Paul Verhoeven (Germany, 1937, based on the operetta Die Fledermaus)
Gasparone, directed by Georg Jacoby (Germany, 1937, based on the operetta Gasparone)
Nanon, directed by Herbert Maisch (Germany, 1938, based on the operetta Nanon)
Boccaccio, directed by Marcello Albani (Italy, 1940, based on the operetta Boccaccio)

Die Fledermaus, directed by Géza von Bolváry (Germany, 1944–46, based on the operetta Die Fledermaus)

A Night in Venice, directed by Georg Wildhagen (Austria, 1953, based on the operetta Eine Nacht in Venedig)
Oh... Rosalinda!!, directed by Michael Powell and Emeric Pressburger (UK, 1955, based on the operetta Die Fledermaus)
Swelling Melodies, directed by E. W. Fiedler (East Germany, 1955, based on the operetta Die Fledermaus)
Gasparone, directed by Karl Paryla (Austria, 1956, based on the operetta Gasparone)
The Beggar Student, directed by Werner Jacobs (West Germany, 1956, based on the operetta Der Bettelstudent)
Mazurka der Liebe, directed by Hans Müller (East Germany, 1957, based on the operetta Der Bettelstudent)
Die Fledermaus, directed by Géza von Cziffra (Austria, 1962, based on the operetta Die Fledermaus)
Die Fledermaus, directed by Yan Frid (Soviet Union, 1979, based on the operetta Die Fledermaus)

References

External links 

 
 List of works 
 
 

1823 births
1895 deaths
19th-century Austrian people
19th-century classical composers
Austrian opera composers
Male opera composers
Austrian Romantic composers
Austrian opera librettists
Austrian male writers
Austrian people of German descent
Austrian people of Prussian descent
Musicians from Gdańsk
People from West Prussia
Austrian male classical composers
19th-century Austrian dramatists and playwrights
19th-century male writers
19th-century male musicians